Naheed Shabbir (or Naheed Shabeer) is a Pakistani television actress and model. Shabbir has appeared in PTV television dramas, Geo TV dramas and Hum TV dramas. The programs include Bint-e-Adam Be Zuban, Bichrein ge ab kaisay, Yadain and Khawab toot jaty hain.

Career 
Naheed Shabbir started her career in 1997 from PTV Home Drama. Naheed did many Drama's Like Khawab toot jaty hain on Geo TV in 2008, Yadain & Bichrein ge ab kaisay in 2007 and Bint-e-Adam & Be Zuban on PTV Home in 2003, Aankh Salamat Andhey Log on ATV, Aik Bechara on ARY Digital in 2009, Akeli as Shahnaz on Hum TV in 2015, Gardish on ARY Digital in 2009, Ghar on PTV Home in 2012, Ishq on Hum TV in 2009, Jeena Isi Ka Naam Hai on TV One Global in 2009, Kaanch Kay Rishtay on PTV Home in 2015, Khushi Ek Roag as Shahida on ARY Digital in 2012, Koi Lamha Gulab Ho as Faiqa on Hum TV in 2013, Main Na Manu Haar as Sarwat on Hum TV in 2014, Naseeb on Indus TV in 2009, Pakistan Quarters on ATV) in 2010, Pyari Shammo on Geo TV in 2009, Roshan Sitara as Riffat on Hum TV in 2012, Saij on Geo TV in 2009, Sanwali on Hum TV in 2010, Sherdil on ARY Digital in 2008, Shikan on PTV Home in 2010, Teray Aajaney Se on TVOne Global in 2006, Tere Baghair as Roohi on Hum TV in 2015–16, Tere Ishq Mein on Geo TV in 2006 & Tumhain Kuch Yaad Hai Jana on Geo TV in 2010.

Personal life
Naheed is married to Amir Mirza on January 16, 2010. Naheed has kids with Amir.

Filmography

Television

Accolades

See also 
 List of Pakistani actresses

References 

Pakistani female models
Pakistani television actresses
Living people
Actresses from Karachi
21st-century Pakistani actresses
Year of birth missing (living people)